The 2010–11 Macedonian Football Cup was the 19th season of Macedonia's football knockout competition. FK Teteks were the defending champions, having won their first title. The 2010–11 champions were FK Metalurg Skopje who won their first title.

Competition calendar

First round
The draw was held on 7 July 2010 in Skopje. Matches were played on 18 August 2010.

|colspan="3" style="background-color:#97DEFF" align=center|18 August 2010

|}

Second round
Entering this round are the 16 winners from the First Round. The first legs took place on 15 September 2010 and the second legs took place on 28, 29 September, 9 and 10 October 2010.

|}

Quarter-finals
The first legs of the quarterfinals took place on 20 October 2010, while the second legs took place on 10 November 2010.

|}

Semi-finals
The first legs of the semi finals took place on 20 April 2011, while the second legs took place on 4 May 2011.

Summary

|}

Matches

Teteks won 6–0 on aggregate.

Metalurg won 2–0 on aggregate.

Final

See also
2010–11 Macedonian First Football League
2010–11 Macedonian Second Football League
2010–11 Macedonian Third Football League

External links
 Official Website
 Macedonian Cup at soccerway.com

Macedonia
Cup
Macedonian Football Cup seasons